Syed Mumtaz Ali Shah (Urdu: سید ممتاز علی شاہ  born 11 March 1933 in the vicinity of Peshawar,
Death  13 January 2021  spina waray peshawar, is a Pakistani actor who has worked in many Pashto dramas. He matriculated in 1948 at the Islamia Collegiate School, Peshawar. He served as a refugee village administrator in the commissioner-ate for Afghan refugees. He has been attached to Radio Pakistan since 1948. He participated in the inaugural drama on Pakistan Television, namely Chaklala, in 1969.

Serials 

In interviews he related the story of his first participation in a radio drama. He had just two lines in the drama about passing a pipe (chelam) to an elder.

Videography

References 

1933 births
2021 deaths
Pakistani Muslims
People from Peshawar
Pakistani male television actors
Recipients of the Pride of Performance